Yağlıvənd is a village in the Fuzuli District of Azerbaijan.

References 

Populated places in Fuzuli District